Balta Albă may refer to several places in Romania:

 Balta Albă, Buzău, a commune in Buzău County
 Titan, Bucharest, a borough in Bucharest also known as Balta Albă

See also
 Balta (disambiguation)